Tensin-4 is a protein that in humans is encoded by the TNS4 gene.

References

Further reading